Aarseth is a Norwegian surname. Notable people with the surname include:

 Asbjørn Aarseth (1935–2009), Norwegian literary historian
 Espen Aarseth (born 1965), Norwegian media scholar
 Ivar Aarseth (1889–1972), Norwegian politician
 Sverre Aarseth (born 1934), British astronomer
 Euronymous, born Øystein Aarseth (1968–1993), Norwegian musician

See also
 9836 Aarseth, main-belt asteroid

Norwegian-language surnames